Selišta may refer to:

Bosnia and Herzegovina
Selišta, Berkovići, a settlement in Berkovići municipality, Republika Srpska
Selišta, Bileća, Republika Srpska
Selišta, Sokolac, Republika Srpska

Montenegro
Selišta, Kolašin
Selišta, Pljevlja

See also
 Selište (disambiguation)
 Seliște (disambiguation)